The 2013–14 Samford Bulldogs basketball team represented Samford University during the 2013–14 NCAA Division I men's basketball season. The Bulldogs, led by second year head coach Bennie Seltzer, played their home games at the Pete Hanna Center and were members of the Southern Conference. They finished the season 13–20, 6–10 in SoCon play to finish in a tie for seventh place. They advanced to the quarterfinals of the SoCon tournament where they lost to Davidson.

After only two seasons and a record of 24–41, head coach Bennie Seltzer was fired. The main reason given for his dismissal was the transfer of 14 players in his two seasons as head coach.

Roster

Schedule

|-
!colspan=9 style="background:#ca1009; color:#14295e;"| Regular season

|-
!colspan=9 style="background:#ca1009; color:#14295e;"| 2014 SoCon tournament

References

Samford Bulldogs men's basketball seasons
Samford
Samford Bulldogs bask
Samford Bulldogs bask